The men's 10,000 metres walk event at the 2010 World Junior Championships in Athletics was held in Moncton, New Brunswick, Canada, at Moncton Stadium on 23 July.

Medalists

Results

Final
23 July

Participation
According to an unofficial count, 24 athletes from 16 countries participated in the event.

References

10,000 metres walk
Racewalking at the World Athletics U20 Championships